The Looking Glass Riverfront School and Career Center is an alternative private school in Eugene, Oregon, United States.

The school has been accredited by the Northwest Association of Accredited Schools since 1993.

References

High schools in Lane County, Oregon
Education in Eugene, Oregon
Alternative schools in Oregon
Schools accredited by the Northwest Accreditation Commission
Private high schools in Oregon